Unravel may refer to:

 "Unravel" (Björk song), 1997
 "Unravel" (TK song), 2014
 Unravel (video game), a 2016 video game

See also
 Unraveled (disambiguation)
 Unraveller (disambiguation)
 Unravelling (disambiguation)